Leota Laki Lamositele-Sio is a Samoan politician and Cabinet Minister. He is a member of the FAST Party.

Leota is a statistician, accountant and manager, who served as Director-General of the National Health Services. After running unsuccessfully as an Independent in the 2016 election, he joined the Human Rights Protection Party. In October 2020 he switched his allegiance to the FAST Party to contest the April 2021 Samoan general election. While preliminary results showed him losing to another FAST candidate, the final result showed him ahead by 9 votes, and he was elected to the Legislative Assembly of Samoa.

On 24 May 2021 he was appointed Minister of Women, Community and Social Development in the elected cabinet of Fiamē Naomi Mataʻafa. The appointment was disputed by the caretaker government. On 23 July 2021 the Court of Appeal ruled that the swearing-in ceremony was constitutional and binding, and that FAST had been the government since 24 May. He was subsequently appointed Associate Minister of Finance, the first time an MP had held both ministerial and associate roles.

Notes

References

Living people
Members of the Legislative Assembly of Samoa
Government ministers of Samoa
Faʻatuatua i le Atua Samoa ua Tasi politicians
Samoan civil servants
Year of birth missing (living people)